The International Basketball League (IBL) was a semi-professional men's basketball league featuring teams from the West Coast of the United States. In 2010 the Albany Legends became the first team in the Northeastern United States to join. The IBL also sometimes featured teams from China and Japan which temporarily relocated to the United States for the IBL season. The IBL season typically ran from the end of March through July.

History 
Founded by Portland area sports promoter Mikal Duilio, the league featured rules designed to create a fast-paced, high-scoring brand of basketball. Duilio first began planning for the league with a series of test games in Portland and Seattle in November 2003. These games featured a mixture of traditional college and NBA rules, plus two rules created specifically for the league:

 The "Immediate Inbound" Rule: After a made basket, the referee threw the ball to a nearby player from the team which had been scored on, instead of a player throwing in the ball from under the basket, to eliminate wasted time.
 A 22-second shot clock was used instead of the NBA's 24-seconds. A defensive non-shooting foul or kicked ball reset it to 12.

The test games proved popular and resulted in the founding of the IBL in August 2004. Founded with eight teams, the league expanded to 17 by the start of the season in April 2005.  Each team played approximately 20 regular season games, most of them centered on their home region, with the teams with the two best records playing in a championship game at the end of the season. The Battle Creek Knights won the inaugural title by going undefeated in the regular season and beating the Dayton Jets in the finals.

In the league's first year, the up-tempo rules resulted in the average team scoring 126.9 points per game, nearly 30 points more than the NBA team average in 2004-05, and slightly higher than the NBA record for points per game by a team in a single season, set by the Denver Nuggets in 1981-82.

In 2010, the league launched a winter season which saw nine different teams compete. Four teams played an entire schedule and thus made them eligible for the playoffs.

In July 2011, Duilio sold the league to Vancouver, Washington, businessman Bryan Hunter. Sharleen Graf was appointed as the league's new commissioner.

In March 2014 the IBL ceased operation as an independent entity and combined with the West Coast Basketball League (WCBL). Teams were split into an 'International Conference' and 'Continental Conference' based on geography.

Teams

Joined other leagues 
Akron Cougars (joined the Universal Basketball League. The league folded before the first season.)
Battle Creek Knights (joined the Independent Basketball Association)
Dayton Air Strikers (rejoined the Premier Basketball League)
Gary Splash (joined the Independent Basketball Association
Holland Blast (joined the Independent Basketball Association)
 Lake County All-Stars (joined the Independent Basketball Association)
Lansing Capitals (joined the Independent Basketball Association)
Kankakee County Soldiers (left to form the Independent Basketball Association)
Salem Stampede (joined the National Athletic Basketball League)
Santa Barbara Breakers (joined the West Coast Pro Basketball League)
Snohomish County Explosion (joined the National Athletic Basketball League)
Washington Raptors (joined the American Basketball Association)
West Virginia Wild (joined the National Professional Basketball League, then the American Basketball Association)

Teams history

Champions

Wins by club

Notable people

Commissioners 
 Mikal Duilio (2004–July 2011)
 Sharleen Graf (July 2011 – 2014)

Players 
 Toby Bailey, former UCLA player and NCAA Champion; NBA player
 Tim Hardaway, former Golden State Warriors star
 David Jackson, former NBA and Euroleague player; former Oregon Duck
 Shawn Kemp, former Seattle SuperSonics star
 Lamond Murray, 13-year NBA veteran
 Dennis Rodman, former Chicago Bulls player and Naismith Memorial Basketball Hall of Fame member
 Bryon Russell, former Utah Jazz star
 Fred Vinson, former Seattle SuperSonics player and current NBA Assistant Coach
 Grayson Boucher American street ball player

Coaches 
 Rob Ridnour, head coach of the Bellingham Slam and father of Seattle SuperSonics guard Luke Ridnour
 Logan Vander Velden, head coach of the Battle Creek Knights and former Los Angeles Clippers player

Final regular season standings

References

External links 
 Official league website

 
Basketball leagues in the United States
Sports leagues established in 2004
2004 establishments in the United States
2014 disestablishments in the United States
Sports leagues disestablished in 2014